Ruler X (also Governor X) is the designation given by archaeologists to a pre-Columbian Maya ruler at the site of Rio Azul, whose name glyphs have otherwise not been satisfactorily deciphered. Ruler X is associated with Tomb 1 located in Structure C-1, where a mural inscription on the walls of the tomb carries the Long Count date of 8.19.1.9.13. This date, equivalent to September 27, 417 CE in the proleptic Gregorian calendar,  has been interpreted as the birth date of this ruler.

Notes

References
 
  
  
  
 

Maya rulers
Date of birth uncertain
Date of death unknown
5th-century rulers